The women's artistic individual all-around event at the 2020 Summer Olympics in Tokyo was held at the Ariake Gymnastics Centre on 29 July 2021. Approximately 80 gymnasts from 49 nations (of the 98 total gymnasts) competed in the all-around in the qualifying round.

Sunisa Lee won the competition, continuing the winning streak of the United States since 2004 in the women's individual all-around. All five events were won by different athletes. Lee is the first women's individual all-around champion of Asian descent, the first Asian-American individual Olympic champion in women's artistic gymnastics, and the first Hmong-American Olympic champion in any sport. Brazil's Rebeca Andrade earned the silver medal for her first Olympic medal, as well as the first medal in women's artistic gymnastics for her country. Andrade is also the first all-around medalist from a country which did not qualify a full team to the Olympics. Angelina Melnikova of ROC rounded off the podium in bronze, adding an individual medal to her two Olympic team medals. Melnikova earned a third consecutive bronze medal for Russian gymnasts in the women's individual all-around, following two from Aliya Mustafina.

The medals for the competition were presented by Anant Singh, South Africa; IOC Member, and the medalists' bouquets were presented by Donatella Sacchi, Italy; FIG Delegate.

Background 
This was the 18th appearance of the women's individual all-around. The first individual all-around competition was held at the 1952 Summer Olympics, and has been held at every edition since. Defending champion Simone Biles of the United States was aiming to become the first woman to defend their Olympic title since Věra Čáslavská did so in 1964 and 1968. However, she withdrew after the first rotation of the women's team final on 26 July after an issue on vault. During the post-meet press conference, Biles cited mental health reasons as the reason she did not continue the competition. The following day, USA Gymnastics confirmed that following further medical evaluation, Biles would also not be competing in the women's individual all-around final. Ellie Black of Canada re-injured her ankle during training the day before the individual women's all around final, and subsequently announced her withdrawal. They were replaced by Jade Carey and Lieke Wevers in the final.

Qualification 

A National Olympic Committee (NOC) could enter up to 6 qualified gymnasts: a team of 4 and up to 2 specialists. A total of 98 quota places are allocated to women's gymnastics.

The 12 teams that qualify will be able to send 4 gymnasts in the team competition, for a total of 48 of the 98 quota places. The top three teams at the 2018 World Artistic Gymnastics Championships (the United States, Russia, and China) and the top nine teams (excluding those already qualified) at the 2019 World Artistic Gymnastics Championships (France, Canada, the Netherlands, Great Britain, Italy, Germany, Belgium, Japan, and Spain) earned team qualification places.

The remaining 50 quota places are awarded individually. Each gymnast can only earn one place, except that gymnasts that competed with a team that qualified are eligible to earn a second place through the 2020 All Around World Cup Series. Some of the individual events are open to gymnasts from NOCs with qualified teams, while others are not. These places are filled through various criteria based on the 2019 World Championships, the 2020 FIG Artistic Gymnastics World Cup series, continental championships, a host guarantee, and a Tripartite Commission invitation.

Each of the 98 qualified gymnasts are eligible for the individual all-around competition, but many gymnasts do not compete in each of the apparatus events.

The COVID-19 pandemic delayed many of the events for qualifying for gymnastics. The 2018 and 2019 World Championships were completed on time, but many of the World Cup series events were delayed into 2021.

Competition format 
The top 24 qualifiers in the qualification phase (limit two per NOC) advance to the all-around final. The finalists perform an additional exercise on each apparatus. Qualification scores are then ignored, with only final round scores counting. Scoring is according to the FIG Code of Points.

Schedule 
The competition was held over two days, Sunday, 25 July and Thursday, 29 July. The qualifying round (for all women's gymnastics events) was the first day; the all-around final was on the second day.

Results

Qualifying 

The gymnasts who ranked in the top twenty-four qualified for the final round. In cases where more than two gymnasts from the same NOC were in the top twenty-four, only the top two ranked among them would qualify to the final round, while the others would be excluded; the next-best ranked gymnast would qualify instead.

 Reserves
The reserves for the individual all-around event final were:
  – called up after Ellie Black's withdrawal 
 
 
 

Only two gymnasts from each country may advance to the all-around final. Gymnasts who did not qualify for the final because of the quota, but had high enough scores to do so were:
 
  – called up after Simone Biles' withdrawal

Final

References 

2021 in women's gymnastics
2020
Women's artistic individual all-around
Women's events at the 2020 Summer Olympics